WSGA may refer to:

 WSGA (FM), a radio station (92.3 FM) licensed to Hinesville, Georgia, United States
 WSEG, a radio station (1400 AM) in Savannah, Georgia, United States, which held the call sign WSGA from 1956 to 1999
 WTHG, a radio station (104.7 FM) in Hinesville, Georgia, United States, which held the call sign WSGA from 2002 to 2006
 WXYY, a radio station (100.1 FM) in Rincon, Georgia, United States, which briefly held the call sign WSGA in 2006
 Washington State Golf Association
 Wyoming Stock Growers Association